The Roman Catholic Diocese of Mogi das Cruzes is a diocese located in the city of Mogi das Cruzes in the Ecclesiastical province of São Paulo in Brazil.

History
 9 June 1962: Established as Diocese of Mogi das Cruzes from the Metropolitan Archdiocese of São Paulo and Diocese of Taubaté

Bishops
 Bishops of Mogi das Cruzes (Roman rite), in reverse chronological order
 Bishop Pedro Luiz Stinghini (19 September 2012–present)
 Bishop Airton José dos Santos (4 August 2004 – 15 April 2012), appointed Archbishop of Campinas, São Paulo 
 Bishop Paulo Antonino Mascarenhas Roxo, O. Praem. (18 November 1989 – 4 August 2004)
 Bishop Emílio Pignoli (29 April 1976 – 15 March 1989), appointed Bishop of Campo Limpo, São Paulo
 Bishop Paulo Rolim Loureiro (4 August 1962 – 2 August 1975)

Other priests of this diocese who became bishops
Rosalvo Cordeiro de Lima, appointed Auxiliary Bishop of Fortaleza, Ceara in 2011
Carlos José de Oliveira (priest here, 1992-1996), appointed Bishop of Apucarana, Parana in 2018

References
 GCatholic.org
 Catholic Hierarchy
 Diocese website (Portuguese)

Roman Catholic dioceses in Brazil
Christian organizations established in 1962
Mogi das Cruzes, Roman Catholic Diocese of
Roman Catholic dioceses and prelatures established in the 20th century
Mogi das Cruzes